Charles Dadi Umeha Onyeama (26 April 1916  – 5 September 1999) was a Justice of the Supreme Court of Nigeria, the first Nigerian Judge at the International Court of Justice, and father of Nigerian Minister of Foreign Affairs, Geoffrey Onyeama, and writer Dillibe Onyeama. He is also grandfather to professional rugby player, Andrew Onyeama Christie.

Early life and education
Charles Onyeama was born in Enugu April 26,1916 ("officially" listed incorrectly as August 5, 1917). He was the son of Chief Onyeama of Eke, a powerful ruler of the Agbaja region of Igboland. Onyeama initially taught at the Government School in Bonny and received his secondary education at King's College, Lagos. He later attended Achimota College in Ghana; University College, London; and read for a degree at Brasenose College, Oxford, from 1940 to 1941. He became a member of Lincoln's Inn.

Career
In 1944, he became an assistant district officer in Lagos, followed by serving on the Legislative Council from 1944 to 1946. After being appointed Chief Magistrate in 1952, he became a judge of the High Council in 1957.

Onyeama served as justice of the Supreme Court of Nigeria from 1964 to 1967. His contemporaries on the Supreme Court included Sir Adetokunbo Ademola, Sir Lionel Brett, Sir Vahe Bairamian, Justice G.B.A. Coker, Justice M.O. Ajegbo, and Justice Chike Idigbe.

After a series of unpopular judgements of the International Court of Justice (ICJ) in 1966, African countries demanded greater representation amongst its judges. The Australian judge filling the seat dedicated to the Commonwealth was replaced with Onyeama after getting elected in November 1966, raising the number of African judges on the ICJ to two. Onyeama served from 1967 to 1976 and was succeeded by Taslim Olawale Elias.

He was appointed as a judge for the 1971 Beagle Channel Arbitration.

From 1982 to 1990, he served as a judge at the World Bank Administrative Tribunal.

Personal life 
Born: April 26, 1916

Official Birthdate: August 5, 1917

Died: September 5, 1999

Spouse: Florence Asigha Wilcox (m. 1966) Susannah Uzoamaka Ogwudu (m. 1950 - 1966)

Children: Warwick Paul John Onyeama, Charles Dillibe Onyeama, Louis Ndubisi Onyeama, Geoffrey Jideofor K. Onyeama, Jubilee Shoshana Chaya Dominic-Charles, Patrick Okey Onyeama, Caroline Onyeama

References

International Court of Justice judges
20th-century Nigerian lawyers
Nigerian jurists
Supreme Court of Nigeria justices
King's College, Lagos alumni
Alumni of Brasenose College, Oxford
1917 births
1999 deaths
People from Enugu
Alumni of Achimota School
Alumni of the University of London
Nigerian judges of United Nations courts and tribunals